Cabinet committee may refer to:

Cabinet committee (Canada)
Cabinet committee on security (India)
Cabinet committee on political affairs (India)
Cabinet committee on national security (Pakistan)
Cabinet committee (United Kingdom)

See also
Ministerial committee